George Anthony (17 April 1904 – 13 July 1971) was  a former Australian rules footballer who played with Footscray in the Victorian Football League (VFL).

Notes

External links 
		

1904 births
1971 deaths
Australian rules footballers from Victoria (Australia)
Western Bulldogs players